The Tambanuo (or Tombonuo) people are an indigenous ethnic group residing in Sabah, Malaysia. They reside in Beluran, Kota Marudu, and Pitas districts of Kudat Division of Sabah. Their population was estimated at 20,000 in the year 1990. They are considered a sub-group of the Orang Sungai, and their language (ISO 639-3 txa) belongs to the Paitanic branch of the Austronesian language family.

References

Ethnic groups in Sabah
Indigenous peoples of Southeast Asia
Kadazan-Dusun people